Reginald John David "Spot" Turnbull (21 February 1908 – 17 July 2006) was an Australian politician.

He was a member of the Tasmanian House of Assembly from 1946 to 1961 (1946–1959 for the Labor Party, 1959–1961 as an Independent), then a Senator for Tasmania from 1962 until 1974.

Though he was elected Senator each time as an Independent, he briefly served as leader of the Australia Party from August 1969 to January 1970.

Turnbull also served as Mayor of Launceston from 1964 to 1965.

References

 

1908 births
2006 deaths
Members of the Australian Senate
Members of the Australian Senate for Tasmania
Treasurers of Tasmania
Members of the Tasmanian House of Assembly
Independent members of the Parliament of Australia
Mayors of Launceston, Tasmania
Australian military personnel of World War II
Australian Army officers
Australian military doctors
20th-century Australian medical doctors
University of Melbourne alumni
People educated at Wesley College (Victoria)
Recipients of the Centenary Medal
Politicians from Shanghai
Chinese emigrants to Australia
Australia Party politicians
Australia Party members of the Parliament of Australia
Australian Labor Party members of the Parliament of Tasmania
20th-century Australian politicians
Tasmanian local councillors